Universe Sandbox is a series of interactive space sandbox gravity simulator educational software video games. Using Universe Sandbox, users can see the effects of gravity on objects in the universe and run scale simulations of the Solar System, various galaxies or other simulations, while at the same time interacting and maintaining control over gravity, time, and other objects in the universe, such as moons, planets, asteroids, comets, and black holes. The original Universe Sandbox was only available for Windows-based PCs, but an updated version was released for Windows, macOS, and Linux in 2015.

Universe Sandbox was designed by Dan Dixon, who released the first version in May 2008. Dixon worked full-time on the project since 2010, founding the company Giant Army the following year. Since then, he has hired eight additional designers for the company. Work on a new version of the game, originally called Universe Sandbox², began in 2014. In November 2018, the original Universe Sandbox was renamed to Universe Sandbox Legacy, and the new version was then renamed to Universe Sandbox in December.

Simulations
Both realistic and fictional simulations appear in Universe Sandbox, with each area of outer space being placed by default or according to the player's preference. Real simulations include the Solar System, which includes the eight planets, five minor planets, 160+ moons, and hundreds of asteroids; and predictions of future events such as the Andromeda and Milky Way galaxy collision which will occur in 3.8 to 4.5 billion years. During gameplay, the player may be introduced to the regions that include the 100 largest bodies in the Solar System, the nearest 1000 stars to the Sun or the nearest 70 galaxies to the Milky Way. A visual size comparison of the largest known stars and planets can be explored, and real time animations of events like the Apophis asteroid passing near Earth in the year 2029 can be watched. Comets can be observed colliding into planets, such as the Shoemaker Levy 9's collision with Jupiter. The trans-Neptunian object 2008 KV42 with a retrograde motion orbit can be seen in a simulation. Moons are able to be converged into planets, and may be able to affect the planet's atmosphere or minerals. Players are able to view the Rho Cancri (55 Cancri) star in the constellation of Cancer; they can see the five known planets in the system. The Pioneer and Voyager spacecraft can be seen in its encounters with Jupiter, Saturn, Uranus, and Neptune. Visual Lagrange points of the Earth and Moon can be seen, along with the galaxy and star system. The gamma-ray burst locations, found in distant galaxies, can be found. Supernovas are shown in real time.

Reception

Duncan Geere of PC Gamer UK gave it an 84/100 and spoke positively of the game, "Universe Sandbox is not going to change your life. It is not going to make you cry, and it won't sit in the top of your most-played list in Steam for weeks. But if you like the idea of an interactive orrery that you can rip apart and put back together in whatever way you like, and you're happy to feed it with a bit of imagination, it's hard to find a better way to spend £6." Jules of Wired said in their review, "I've seen some pretty wonderful interactive programs that allow you and your family to explore the vast regions of the universe, but nothing nearly as enthralling as Universe Sandbox. [...] Unlike most astronomy software that just shows you what the sky looks like or where the planets are, Universe Sandbox is a powerful gravity simulator."

Rewrite

The team began working on a complete rewrite of Universe Sandbox, originally titled Universe Sandbox², in 2014. Some of the new features include atmospheres being shown on planets, dynamic and procedurally generated textures on stars and gas giants, a more realistic and graphic collision system, 3D charts in chart mode, simulation of stellar evolution, procedural detail in rings/particles, visualization of black holes, simulation of fluid-like objects (such as gas clouds, nebulae and protoplanetary disks, and planetary collisions) and much more. The team demonstrated many of these features at the Unite 2012 conference. On November 15, 2018, the feature to share simulations through Steam Workshop was added. Such simulations like Planet X crashing into Earth, Venus and Mars as the planets were billions of years ago are possible. In December 2018, the game was renamed from Universe Sandbox² to Universe Sandbox.

See also
 
 
 
 
 Gravity (software)

References

External links
 

2008 software
2014 software
2008 video games
2014 video games
Astronomy software
Educational software for macOS
Educational software for Linux
Windows games
MacOS games
Linux games
Space simulators